William George Wyman (né Perks; born 24 October 1936) is an English musician who achieved international fame as the bassist for the Rolling Stones from 1962 until 1993. In 1989, he was inducted into the Rock and Roll Hall of Fame as a member of The Rolling Stones. Since 1997, he has recorded and toured with his own band, Bill Wyman's Rhythm Kings. He has worked producing records and films, and has scored music for films and television.

Wyman has kept a journal since he was a child during World War II, and has published seven books. He is also a photographer, and his works have been displayed in galleries around the world.

Wyman is an amateur archaeologist and enjoys metal detecting. He designed and marketed a patented "Bill Wyman signature metal detector", which he has used to find relics in the English countryside dating back to the era of the Roman Empire.

Early life
He was born William George Perks in Lewisham Hospital in Lewisham, South London, the son of bricklayer William George Perks and Kathleen May ("Molly"), née Jeffery. One of six children, Wyman spent most of his early life living in Penge, Southeast London. Wyman described his wartime childhood as  "scarred by poverty", having survived The Blitz and enemy fighter plane strafing that killed neighbours.

Wyman attended Oakfield Primary School, passing his eleven plus exam to gain entry to Beckenham and Penge County Grammar School from 1947 to Easter 1953, leaving before the GCE exams after his father found him a job working for a bookmaker and insisted that he take it.

Music career
Wyman took piano lessons from age 10 to 13. A year after his marriage on 24 October 1959 to Diane Cory, an 18-year-old bank clerk, he bought a Burns electric guitar for £52 on hire-purchase, but was not satisfied by his progress. He switched to bass guitar after hearing one at a Barron Knights concert. He created a fretless electric bass guitar by removing the frets on a second hand UK-built Dallas Tuxedo bass and played this in a south London band, the Cliftons, in 1961.

He legally changed his surname to Wyman in August 1964, taking the phonetic surname of a friend, Lee Whyman, with whom he had done national service in the Royal Air Force from 1955 to 1957.

The Rolling Stones and 1980s side projects

When drummer Tony Chapman told him that a rhythm and blues band called the Rolling Stones needed a bass player, he auditioned at a pub in Chelsea on 7 December 1962 and was hired as a successor to Dick Taylor. The band were impressed by his instrument and amplifiers (one of which Wyman modified himself, and a Vox AC30). Wyman was the oldest member of the group.

In addition to playing bass, Wyman frequently provided backing vocals on early records, and through 1967, in concert as well. He wrote and sang lead on the track "In Another Land" from the album Their Satanic Majesties Request, which was released as a single and credited solely to Wyman, making it his first official solo single. The song is one of two Wyman compositions released by the Rolling Stones; the second is "Downtown Suzie" (sung by Mick Jagger), on Metamorphosis, a collection of Rolling Stones outtakes. The title "Downtown Suzie" was chosen by their erstwhile manager Allen Klein without consulting Wyman or the band. The original title was "Sweet Lisle Lucy", named after Lisle Street, a street in the red light district in Soho, London.

Wyman was close to Brian Jones; they usually shared rooms while on tour and often went to clubs together. He and Jones hung out together even when Jones was distancing himself from the band. Wyman was distraught when he heard the news of Jones' death, being one of two members (Watts was the other) to attend Jones' funeral in July 1969. Wyman was also friends with guitarist Mick Taylor. Like the other Rolling Stones, he has worked with Taylor since the latter's departure from the band in 1974.

Wyman has kept a journal throughout his life, beginning when he was a child, and used it in writing his 1990 autobiography Stone Alone and his 2002 book Rolling with the Stones. In Stone Alone, Wyman states that he composed the riff of "Jumpin' Jack Flash" with Brian Jones and drummer Charlie Watts. Wyman mentions that "(I Can't Get No) Satisfaction" was released as a single only after a 3–2 vote within the band: Wyman, Watts and Jones voted for, Jagger and Keith Richards against, feeling it not sufficiently commercial.

Wyman also played on The London Howlin' Wolf Sessions, released 1971, with Howlin' Wolf, Eric Clapton, Charlie Watts and Stevie Winwood, and on the album Jamming with Edward, released in 1972, with Ry Cooder, Nicky Hopkins, Jagger and Watts. He played bass on at least two tracks of the 1967 album "I Can Tell" by John P. Hammond

In July 1981, Wyman's solo single "(Si Si) Je Suis un Rock Star"  became a top-20 hit in many countries. Also in 1981, Wyman composed the soundtrack album Green Ice for the Ryan O'Neal/Omar Sharif film of the same name. In the mid-1980s, he composed music for two films by Italian director Dario Argento: Phenomena (1985) and Terror at the Opera (1987).

In 1983, Wyman helped organize a fundraiser for Action Research into Multiple Sclerosis in the form of a concert tour with a group calling themselves Willie and the Poor Boys. The group played shows in the U.S. and the UK that included a rotating group of guest musicians, including Eric Clapton, Jeff Beck, and Jimmy Page. The effort was inspired by Wyman's friend and former Small Faces and Faces musician Ronnie Lane. The group produced an album of the same name that lists Wyman, Charlie Watts, Geraint Watkins, Mickey Gee, and Andy Fairweather Low as principal members, plus Ray Cooper, Jimmy Page, Willie Garnett, Chris Rea, Steve Gregory, Paul Rodgers, Kenney Jones, Henry Spinetti, and Terry Williams.

Wyman made a cameo appearance in the 1987 film Eat the Rich. He produced and played on a few albums of the group Tucky Buzzard.

After the Rolling Stones' 1989–90 Steel Wheels/Urban Jungle Tours, Wyman left the band in January 1993. The Rolling Stones have continued to record and tour with Darryl Jones on bass, but not as an official member of the band.

In 2012, Wyman and Mick Taylor were expected to join the Rolling Stones on stage at shows in London (25 and 29 November) and Newark (13 and 15 December), though Darryl Jones supplied the bass for the majority of the show. At the first London show on 25 November, Wyman played on two back-to-back songs, "It's Only Rock 'n Roll" and "Honky Tonk Women". He later stated that he was not interested in joining the band for further tour dates in 2013.

Later activity

Wyman was a judge for the 5th annual Independent Music Awards to support independent artists' careers.

On 25 October 2009, Wyman performed a reunion show with Faces, filling in for the late Ronnie Lane as he had previously done in 1986 and 1993.

On 19 April 2011, pianist Ben Waters released an Ian Stewart tribute album titled Boogie 4 Stu. Wyman played on two tracks: "Rooming House Boogie" and "Watchin' the River Flow", the latter recorded with the Rolling Stones.

Musical instruments
Wyman's bass sound came not only from his 30-inch short-scale fretless bass (the so-called "homemade" bass; actually a modified Dallas Tuxedo bass), but also from the "walking bass" style he adopted, inspired by Willie Dixon and Ricky Fenson. Wyman has played a number of basses, nearly all short scale, including a Framus Star bass and a number of other Framus basses, a Vox Teardrop bass (issued as a Bill Wyman signature model), a Fender Mustang Bass, two Ampeg Dan Armstrong basses, a Gibson EB-3, and a Travis Bean bass. Since the late 1980s, Wyman has primarily played Steinberger basses. In 2011, The Bass Centre in London issued the Wyman Bass, a fretted interpretation of Wyman's first "homemade" fretless bass, played and endorsed by Wyman. One of Wyman's basses was the most expensive bass ever sold; his 1969 Fender Mustang Bass sold in an auction for $380,000 in 2020.

Personal life

Wyman, although moderate in his use of alcohol and drugs, has stated that he became "girl mad" as a psychological crutch.

Wyman married his first wife, Diane Cory, in 1959 and their son Stephen Paul Wyman was born on 29 March 1962. They separated in 1967 and divorced in 1969.

On 2 June 1989, aged 52, Wyman married 18-year-old Mandy Smith, whom he had "fallen in love with" when she was 13 and, according to Smith, had a sexual relationship with when she was 14. The couple separated two years later and finalised their divorce two years after that. In April 1993 Wyman married model Suzanne Accosta, whom he first met in 1980; the two had remained friends until their romance developed. The couple have three daughters.

In 1993, Wyman's son Stephen Wyman married Patsy Smith, the 46-year-old mother of Bill's ex-wife Mandy Smith. Stephen was 30 years old at the time. Therefore, Bill became the father-in-law of his ex-mother-in-law as well as the stepgrandfather of his former wife.

In 1968, Wyman bought Gedding Hall as his country home near Bury St Edmunds in Suffolk, it dates back to 1458 Wyman also lives in St Paul de Vence in the South of France where his friends include numerous artists. He is a keen cricket enthusiast and admired Denis Compton and played in a celebrity match at the Oval against a former England XI, taking a hat-trick. He is a lifelong Crystal Palace F.C. fan, attending his first match as a birthday treat with father William. On a 1990 European tour with the Rolling Stones, he feigned a toothache and said he needed to travel back to London to see a dentist when in fact he went to watch Palace at Wembley in the 1990 FA Cup Final. It was around this period of the Stones "Steel Wheels" tour he developed his fear of aeroplane flying.

Wyman started selling metal detectors in 2007. Treasure-detecting adventures in the British Isles are detailed in his 2005 illustrated book, Treasure Islands, co-written with Richard Havers.

In 2009, Wyman quit smoking after 55 years.

Wyman is a photographer who has taken photographs throughout his career, and in June 2010 he launched a retrospective of his work in an exhibition in St Paul de Vence. The exhibition included images of his musical and artistic acquaintances from the South of France including Marc Chagall. In 2013, the Rook & Raven Gallery in London hosted an exhibition of a selection of Wyman's images which had been reworked by artists including Gerald Scarfe.

In March 2016, Wyman was diagnosed with prostate cancer but expected to make a full recovery.

Discography
With The Rolling Stones

 The Rolling Stones / England's Newest Hit Makers (1964)
 12 X 5 (1964)
 The Rolling Stones No. 2 / The Rolling Stones, Now! (1965)
 Out of Our Heads (1965)
 December's Children (And Everybody's) (1965)
 Aftermath (1966)
 Between the Buttons (1967)
 Their Satanic Majesties Request (1967)
 Beggars Banquet (1968)
 Let It Bleed (1969)
 Sticky Fingers (1971)
 Exile on Main St. (1972)
 Goats Head Soup (1973)
 It's Only Rock 'n Roll (1974)
 Black and Blue (1976)
 Some Girls (1978)
 Emotional Rescue (1980)
 Tattoo You (1981)
 Undercover (1983)
 Dirty Work (1986)
 Steel Wheels (1989)

Solo albums
 Monkey Grip (June 1974) UK No. 39, AUS No. 36, US No. 99
 Stone Alone (March 1976) US No. 166
 Green Ice (soundtrack) (1981)
 Bill Wyman (April 1982) UK No. 55, AUS No. 59
 Stuff (October 1992 in Japan and Argentina only, 2000 UK)
 Back to Basics (22 June 2015)

Collaborative album
 Willie & The Poor Boys (May 1985) US No. 96 [12 wks] (with Mickey Gee, Andy Fairweather-Low, Geraint Watkins, and Charlie Watts)

Compilation albums
 Bill Wyman's Blues Odyssey (2002) - US Blues Albums No. 11
 A Stone Alone: The Solo Anthology 1974–2002 (2002, UK)

Bill Wyman's Rhythm Kings

 Struttin' Our Stuff (October 1997)
 Anyway the Wind Blows (October 1998)
 Groovin' (May 2000) UK No. 52 [3 wks]
 Double Bill (May 2001) UK No. 88 [2 wks]
 Just for a Thrill (May 2004) UK No. 149 [1 wk]
 Studio Time (April 2018)

Also plays on
 I Can Tell, John Hammond, Jr., 1967
 The London Howlin' Wolf Sessions, 1971
 Manassas, 1972
 Jamming with Edward!, 1972
 Goodnight Vienna, Ringo Starr, 1974
 Drinkin' TNT 'n' Smokin' Dynamite, Buddy Guy & Junior Wells, 1982 (recorded live at Montreux 1974; also the 1991 film Messin' with the Blues from the same festival, which features eight songs with this line-up, including four fronted by Muddy Waters)

Solo singles
 "In Another Land" (December 1967) - US No. 87, Canada No. 21
 "Monkey Grip Glue" (June 1974)
 "White Lightnin'" (September 1974) - AUS No. 99
 "A Quarter to Three" (April 1976)
 "If You Wanna Be Happy" (1976)
 "Apache Woman" (1976)
 "(Si Si) Je Suis un Rock Star" (July 1981) - UK No. 14, AUS No. 5
 "Visions" (1982)
 "Come Back Suzanne" (March 1982) - AUS No. 12
 "A New Fashion" (March 1982) - UK No. 37 
 "Baby Please Don't Go" (June 1985) - US Mainstream Rock No. 35 
 "What & How & If & When & Why" (June 2015)

Bibliography
Bill Wyman has authored or co-authored the following titles:

Archaeology
 Bill Wyman's Treasure Islands

The Rolling Stones
 Stone Alone 
 Rolling with the Stones .
 Bill Wyman's Blues Odyssey 
 The Stones – A History in Cartoons 

The last three books and Bill Wyman's Treasure Islands were all written in collaboration with Richard Havers.

A Journey through America with the Rolling Stones. Robert Greenfield. Helter Skelter Publication. ISBN 1-900924-24-2

Art
 Wyman Shoots Chagall

References

External links

 
 Bill Wyman's villa in Vence, South of France
 Bill Wyman at AllMusic
 

1936 births
Amateur archaeologists
English expatriates in France
English rock bass guitarists
Male bass guitarists
English non-fiction writers
Living people
People educated at Beckenham and Penge County Grammar School
People from Penge
People from the Borough of St Edmundsbury
Royal Air Force airmen
The Rolling Stones members
People from Sydenham, London
British rhythm and blues boom musicians
English archaeologists
Musicians from Kent
Conservative Party (UK) people
English male non-fiction writers
20th-century Royal Air Force personnel
20th-century English bass guitarists
21st-century English bass guitarists
Bill Wyman's Rhythm Kings members
All-Stars (band) members